Istora MRT Station (or Istora Mandiri MRT Station, with Bank Mandiri granted for naming rights) is a rapid transit station on the North-South Line of the Jakarta MRT in Jakarta, Indonesia. Located on Jl.

The station is located near the Sudirman Central Business District (SCBD), which houses the Indonesia Stock Exchange, Pacific Place mall, and Ritz-Carlton hotel, among others. The word Istora in its name comes from Istora Gelora Bung Karno, located within Gelora Bung Karno Sports Complex nearby the station.

Location 

The second underground station on the MRT, Istora Mandiri station is located on Jl. Jendral Sudirman in Kebayoran Baru, South Jakarta. Nearby is the shopping mall of Pacific Place, the Ritz-Carlton Hotel, and the Indonesia Stock Exchange, all located within the greater Sudirman Central Business district (SCBD). The station is located close to the Gelora Bung Karno Sports complex and The Sultan hotel, and close to the Semanggi Interchange with Jl. Gatot Sobroto and the Jakarta Inner Ring Road.

History 

Station layout

Gallery

References

External links 
 
  Istora Mandiri Station on the Jakarta MRT website

Central Jakarta
Jakarta MRT stations
Railway stations opened in 2019